The Football West State Cup is a soccer competition held between clubs in the Australian state of Western Australia, known as the Belt Up Cup for sponsorship reasons. It serves as preliminary rounds for the Australia Cup, previously known as the FFA Cup, with the 2 finalists also entering the final stages of that competition.

History
Several knockout competitions have been held since 1895 in various forms, with one of the two major Western Australian knockout cup competitions initially called the Challenge Cup, from 1903 to 1959 as the Challenge Cup and Shield, between 1960 and 1995 as the D’Orsogna Cup, and since that time with a number of naming rights sponsors.

The other major knockout competition in Western Australia was the Charity Cup, held between 1903 and 1961. This was considered the pre-eminent cup competition prior to the Second World War.

Since 2014, this knockout competition has also served as preliminary rounds for the Australia Cup, previously known as the FFA Cup, with Western Australia represented by the 2 finalists, along with the A-League club Perth Glory FC.

Current Cup Competitions (since 2014)

The current format is also a qualifying completion for the Australia Cup, previously known as the FFA Cup, where both the finalists qualify for the Round of 32.

Recent Cup Competitions 1996–2013

D’Orsogna Cup 1960–1995

Challenge Cup and Shield 1899–1959

Charity Cup 1903–1961

External links
Football West Official website
Western Australian Football Website

Notes

References 

 
Soccer cup competitions in Australia
Soccer in Western Australia